Khlong Sun Railway Halt is a railway halt located in Phruphi Subdistrict, Ban Na San District, Surat Thani, Thailand.

Train services 
 Local No. 447/448 Surat Thani-Sungai Kolok-Surat Thani

References 
 
 

Railway stations in Thailand